The 1983 Australian Touring Car season was the 24th season of touring car racing in Australia commencing from 1960 when the first Australian Touring Car Championship and the first Armstrong 500 (the forerunner of the present day Bathurst 1000) were contested.

The year was known for its political infighting over the homologation of parts by the Confederation of Australian Motorsport (CAMS). The new homologation grants for 1 August were announced on 29 May during the running of Round 7 of the Touring Car Championship at Sydney's Oran Park by ABC television commentators Will Hagon and John Smailes. This drew public criticism from the drivers who were only told about the grants post race. As a result of the way CAMS announced the homologation grants, both the Roadways and Nissan teams boycotted of the final round at Lakeside, despite Nissan driver George Fury going into the round as the championship leader and needing only to finish 9th in the race to claim the title. The boycott ultimately cost Fury the championship as his only rival Allan Moffat finished a safe 3rd to claim his fourth and last ATCC series win.

During the year CAMS also announced that the 1984 season would be the last for the locally developed Group C category which had been in place since 1973, before the move to the FIA's international Group A rules from 1985. This in effect took the homologation issue out of CAMS hands, with the FIA having the final say on all homologated cars and parts.

Touring Cars competed at 19 race meetings in Australia during the 1983 season, contesting the following events:
 The eight rounds of the 1983 Australian Touring Car Championship (ATCC)
 The six rounds of the 1983 Australian Endurance Championship, run concurrently with the 1983 Australian Endurance Championship of Makes
 The four rounds of the 1983 AMSCAR series, held exclusively at Amaroo Park in Sydney (each round consisted of 3 races).
 A touring car support race at the 1983 Australian Grand Prix meeting held at Calder Park in Melbourne.

Race calendar

Australian Touring Car Championship

Australian Endurance Championship

Australian Endurance Championship of Makes

Castrol 400

James Hardie 1000

AMSCAR Series

Australian Grand Prix support race 
A Group C race was a support event at the 1983 Australian Grand Prix meeting. Known as the "Berri Fruit Juices Trophy" race, George Fury won driving his Nissan Motor Co. Bluebird Turbo. Peter Brock finished second in his Holden Dealer Team Commodore, with team mate Larry Perkins driving the Bathurst winning #25 car to 3rd place.

References

Linked articles contain additional references.

External links
 Official V8 Supercar site

Australian Touring Car Championship
Touring Cars